Jatjuk or pine nut porridge is a variety of juk (porridge) made by boiling finely ground pine nuts and rice flour in water. It is a mild, nutritious, and easily digestibile dish often served to recovering patients and the elderly.

Preparation 
The porridge is made with white rice and pine nuts, which are separately soaked, ground and sieved. The ground rice is then boiled, with ground pine nuts added a little at a time while simmering. Grinding the ingredients together causes them to separate after boiling. The porridge is seasoned with salt and often garnished with whole or crushed pine nuts.

See also 
 Jat-guksu
 List of porridges

References 

Juk
Korean royal court cuisine
Nut dishes